The ZMZ-24 was an automobile engine produced by Zavolzhye Engine Factory (Zavolzhye Motorni Zavod, ZMZ) in the Soviet Union.

It was also produced as the UMZ 4178.10.

It "quickly became the mainstay of the Soviet engine industry", and would be used in a variety of vehicles.

The improved ZMZ-24D, found in the GAZ-24, ran on 92 RON gasoline (while the ZMZ-24-01 could use commonly available 76 octane, and the ZMZ-24-07 could use liquid propane). The cylinder block was die cast, instead of the slower coquille for the 21A. The engine featured a twin-choke carburettor, with a higher compression ratio, producing  at 4500 rpm and an even more impressive  of torque at 2200–2400 RPM.

By 1970, the ZMZ-24 had been renamed the ZMZ-402.10, with a lower-compression 4021.10 version, which remained in limited production until 2006. In this format, it was used in the RAF minibus and ErAZ van.

It also served as the basis for the sixteen-valve   ZMZ-4062.10 (seen in some Volgas after 1996), the   ZMZ-40552.10 (used in GAZ's commercial vehicles), the  ZMZ-409.10 of the UAZ Patriot, and the ZMZ-5143 diesel all derive from the ZMZ-24.

Notes

Sources 
 Thompson, Andy. Cars of the Soviet Union. Somerset, UK: Haynes Publishing, 2008.

Cars of Russia
Automobile engines
Zavolzhye Engine Factory
Soviet automobiles
Soviet brands